FXCollaborative is an American architecture, planning, and interior design firm founded in 1978 by Robert F. Fox Jr. and Bruce S. Fowle as Fox & Fowle Architects. The firm merged with Jambhekar Strauss in 2000 and was renamed to FXFOWLE Architects in 2005 following Fox's departure. The firm was renamed to FXCollaborative on January 18, 2018. The firm is best known for projects in New York City including the Condé Nast Building, Reuters Building (3 Times Square), Eleven Times Square, renovation of the Jacob K. Javits Convention Center, and the Statue of Liberty Museum.

Selected projects
 One Willoughby Square, Brooklyn, NY (2021)
 Statue of Liberty Museum, New York Harbor (2019)
 888 Boylston Street, Boston, MA (2016)
 35XV, New York, NY (2016)
 Scott Bieler Clinical Sciences Center, Roswell Park Comprehensive Cancer Center, Buffalo, NY (2016)
 Congregation Kehilath Jeshurun Synagogue Reconstruction, New York, NY (2015)
 Allianz Tower, Istanbul, Turkey (2014)
 Hunter's Point Campus, Queens, NY (2013)
 Jacob K. Javits Center Renovation, New York, NY (2013)
 Eleven Times Square, New York, NY (2010)
 Alice Tully Hall and The Juilliard School Renovation and Expansion, New York, NY (2009), in collaboration with Diller Scofidio + Renfro
 Center for Global Conservation at the Bronx Zoo, New York, NY (2009)
 The New York Times Building, New York, NY (2009), in collaboration with Renzo Piano Building Workshop
 Reuters Building (3 Times Square), New York, NY (2001)
 Condé Nast Building (4 Times Square), New York, NY (1999)

References

External links
 
 AIA New York Chapter Architecture Firm Directory

Companies based in Manhattan
1978 establishments in New York (state)